Asit Mazumdar is an Indian Politician. He was elected as MLA of Chunchura Vidhan Sabha Constituency in West Bengal Legislative Assembly in 2011,2016 and 2021. He is an All India Trinamool Congress politician. He is Currently Serving Vice Chairman of South Bengal State Transport Corporation and Vice President of Hooghly District Trinamool Congress.

References

Year of birth missing (living people)
Living people
Trinamool Congress politicians from West Bengal
West Bengal MLAs 2011–2016
West Bengal MLAs 2016–2021